Che Lei Pai, also known as Knob Reef, is an islet in Tolo Channel in the northeastern New Territories of Hong Kong.  The island is north of Pak Kok Chai and south of Fu Tau Sha. It is under the administration of the Tai Po District.

Investigations into pollution levels in the waters around Hong Kong has found that Che Lei Pai has the greater ecosystem multifunctionality and health as compared to other, nearby bodies of water.

References

Uninhabited islands of Hong Kong
Tai Po District